A watersail is a sail hung below the  boom. It is used mostly on gaff rig boats for extra downwind performance when racing. Often a watersail will be improvised from an unused foresail. Its psychological effects may be more effective than its aerodynamic ones. 

 

Sailing rigs and rigging